"Good Things Fall Apart" is a song by American EDM producer Illenium and American singer-songwriter Jon Bellion.  It was released on May 13, 2019, on Astralwerks, alongside its lyric video. It serves as the fourth single from Illenium's third studio album Ascend. It became Illenium's first top ten hit on the US Dance/Electronic Songs chart, peaking at number 4.

Background 
The song was first teased on April 26, 2019, by Illenium and Jon Bellion via their Twitter accounts. Bellion tweeted that he missed "sadboy anthems of the Yellowcard/Dashboard Confessional/Taking Back Sunday era". Illenium then somewhat confirmed a collab by responding to Bellion's tweet, writing "Sadboi anthem incoming".

Music video
The song's release was accompanied by the lyric video, followed by a music video on June 10, 2019. Directed by Jeremi Durand, the video follows two astronauts attempting to flee the planet as it is destroyed; scenes of Illenium and Bellion performing the song in military wardrobe are intercut throughout the video.

Other uses
The song is available as DLC for Rock Band 4.

"Tiësto's Big Room Remix" premiered on July 12, 2019.

Travis Barker remixed the song and released it on YouTube on December 3, 2019.

Charts

Weekly charts

Year-end charts

Certifications

Release history

References

2019 singles
2019 songs
Torch songs
Songs written by Jason Evigan
Song recordings produced by Jason Evigan
Songs written by James Abrahart
Songs written by Jon Bellion
Songs written by Sarah Hudson (singer)
Illenium songs
Songs written by Illenium